The Poet Laureate of Iowa is the poet laureate for the U.S. state of Iowa. The position was created July 1, 1999 by Subchapter 303.89 of the Iowa Code with a two-year renewable term.

List of Poets Laureate
 Marvin Bell (2000-2004)
 Robert Dana (2004-2008) 
 Mary Swander (2009-2019)
 Debra Marquart (2019-Present)

See also

 Poet laureate
 List of U.S. states' poets laureate
 United States Poet Laureate

References

 
Iowa culture
American Poets Laureate